Con or CON may refer to:

Places
 Commonwealth of Nations, or CON, an association of primarily former British colonies
 Concord Municipal Airport (IATA airport code CON), a public-use airport in Merrimack County, New Hampshire, United States 
 Cornwall, England, Chapman code CON

Arts, entertainment, and media
 Con (TV series), a television show about confidence trickery
 Con Air, a 1997 American action crime film
 Naruto: Clash of Ninja, or CON, a 3D cel-shaded fighting game
 The Chronicles of Narnia, or CON, a series of seven fantasy novels for children written by C. S. Lewis

Brands and enterprises
 Consolidated Edison, also called Con Edison or ConEd
 Continental Oil

Language
 Con language
 Conlang, a constructed language

Other uses

Con
 Con (name)
 Confidence trick, also known as con, scam, or flim flam; con is also a person who perpetrates a confidence trick
 Conn (nautical), also spelled con, the command of movement of a ship at sea
 Consider (MUD), the ability to evaluate an opponent in MUDs
 Contact lens, in Hong Kong English
 Contra (or against), as in the original Latin phrase pro et contra
 Convention (meeting)
 Fan convention, e.g. "Comic-Con"
 Convict, as in con, a person who has been convicted of a crime, or ex-con, a person who has completed their prison sentence
 Convicted felon, a person who has been convicted of a felony crime in a court of law
 Con, a musical term meaning "with" borrowed from Italian (see Italian musical terms used in English)

CON
 Certificate of Need, or CON
 Commander of the Order of the Niger, or CON
 Cornwall, county in England, Chapman code
 CON, a name not allowed for folders in Microsoft Windows, see List of Easter eggs in Microsoft products#Microsoft Windows.

See also 
 Conn (disambiguation)
 Conning (disambiguation)
 Conrad (name)
 Conservative Party (disambiguation)
 Constantine (disambiguation)
 Contra (disambiguation)
 Contrary (disambiguation)
 Khan (disambiguation)
 Kon (disambiguation)
 Pro (disambiguation)